is a Japanese football player. He plays for Veertien Mie.

Playing career
Wanami was born in Inabe on April 27, 1980. After graduating from high school, he joined J1 League club Bellmare Hiratsuka (later Shonan Bellmare) in 1999. He became a regular player as left side midfielder in the middle of 1999. However the club was relegated to J2 League from 2000. In 2001, he moved to newly was promoted to J1 club, Consadole Sapporo. He played many matches as left side midfielder. However the club was relegated to J2 from 2003. In 2004, he moved to Vissel Kobe on loan. However he could not play at all in the match for injury. In May 2004, he returned to Consadole Sapporo. He played as regular player until 2005. However his opportunity to play decreased from 2006 and he retired end of 2007 season. In 2013, he came back as player at his local club Veertien Kuwana (later Veertien Mie) in Prefectural Leagues. The club was promoted to Regional Leagues from 2015 and Japan Football League from 2017.

Club statistics

References

External links

Consadole Sapporo

1980 births
Living people
Association football people from Mie Prefecture
Japanese footballers
J1 League players
J2 League players
Japan Football League players
Shonan Bellmare players
Hokkaido Consadole Sapporo players
Vissel Kobe players
Veertien Mie players
Association football midfielders